Hong Kong Baptist Hospital (HKBH) is a Nonprofit Christian hospital in Kowloon, Hong Kong.

It is located in Kowloon Tong, Kowloon City District, Kowloon. However, the official address is 222 Waterloo Road, Kowloon, Hong Kong, omitting the neighbourhood and the district.

Background
Founded in 1963, it was the first private hospital in Hong Kong. It does not provide accident and emergency (A&E) services. HKBH has more than 860 beds and approximately 2200 staff.

HKBH is one of the social service institutions of the Baptist Convention of Hong Kong. It is wholly self-financing and non-profit. It provides a wide range of inpatient and outpatient services and is well regarded not only in Hong Kong but also in China. As an example, among Hong Kong's private sector hospitals, HKBH has the most mainland expectant mothers giving birth.

HKBH has an active nursing school and is committed to educational development. It is affiliated with the Open University of Hong Kong, which enables nurses to be trained up to the university degree standard 

Hong Kong Baptist Hospital is involved in international healthcare accreditation, and for many years it has been subjected to rigorous bi-annual survey by the UK's QHA Trent Accreditation Scheme which is a variant of the Trent Accreditation Scheme.

See also 
List of hospitals in Hong Kong

References

External links

Hong Kong Baptist Hospital, Hong Kong - web site
Kowloon International Baptist Church (KIBC) - web site
International Baptist Church of Hong Kong - web site

Hospital buildings completed in 1963
Hospitals in Hong Kong
Medical Services by Protestant Churches in Hong Kong
Hospitals established in 1963
Nursing schools in Hong Kong
Baptist hospitals
Hospitals in Kowloon City District
Kowloon Tong
Protestantism in Hong Kong